The Cherchenay were one of the Circassian tribes. They were destroyed in the Russo-Circassian War.

Area 
According to Walter Richmond, they lived in the inner parts of Western Circassia, near the Chemirgoys.

References 

Circassian tribes
Historical ethnic groups of Russia